Giovan Tomaso di Maio (also Majo, Mayo, c. 1490 - after 1548) was an Italian composer. His villanelle, like those of Giovanni Domenico da Nola, were popular throughout Italy.

References

1490 births
16th-century deaths
16th-century Italian composers